The Flag of Gilgit–Baltistan is the flag of the Autonomous Province of Gilgit Baltistan within "Northern Pakistan". The Gilgit Baltistan provincial flag shows the emblem of Pakistan is reflective of the natural topography of the province - the Markhor, is the "National animal"; Deodar cedar, is the "National tree"; and K2 is the "National mountain" of the country. Displaying Pakistani national colours, white and dark Green, with a Crescent and star to represent the Muslim-majority all of which shows its Islamic heritage and strong ties with the Federation of Pakistan respectively. No Inscription devised below in Urdu, respectively.

Other flags

Related pages
 Flag of Pakistan (Federal)
 Government of Gilgit–Baltistan, Pakistan
 Gilgit-Baltistan, Pakistan emblem
 List of Pakistani flags

References 

 
Gilgit Baltistan
Gilgit Baltistan
Gilgit-Baltistan